The O Forum Kentish Town is a concert venue in Kentish Town, London, England owned by MAMA & Company, and originally built in 1934.

History
The venue was built in 1934 and was originally used as an art deco cinema. After the cinema was closed, the venue re-opened as an Irish dance hall. In the 1980s, it changed directions from a bingo hall, to dance hall then to a live music venue under the name Town & Country Club. In 1993, Mean Fiddler purchased the venue and renamed it the London Forum. The final show at the T&C was Van Morrison on 21 March 1993.

In 2007, MAMA & Company purchased the Forum from Mean Fiddler and spent £1.5 million on renovations, and increasing the capacity to 2,300. In 2015, the venue was acquired by Live Nation, and re-branded as O2 Forum Kentish Town, as part of the O2 Academy Group.

The venue has standing downstairs and benched seating in booths on the upstairs balcony, or a fully seated layout for certain shows.

Noted performers

 Aleyna Tilki
 Alice in Chains
 Arctic Monkeys
 Ateez
 Babymetal
 Biffy Clyro
 Big Country
 Bjorn Again
 Bon Jovi
 Built To Spill
 The B-52's
 Chance the Rapper
 Coldplay
 Conor McGregor
 The Cure (a secret gig with the name 5 Imaginary Boys)
 Cutting Crew
 Daði Freyr
 The Damned
 Danny Wilson
 David Bowie
 Day6
 Del Amitri
 Devo
 DragonForce
 Drain Gang
 Eurythmics
 Franz Ferdinand
 Fields of The Nephilim
 Gorillaz
 Gustavo Cerati
 Gym Class Heroes
 Half Man Half Biscuit
 Hothouse Flowers
 Hurts
 INXS
 It Bites
 Jack White
 Jagged Edge
 James Brown
 Jamiroquai
 Jesus Jones
 Joe Cocker
 John Martyn
 John Mayall's Bluesbreakers
 Justin Timberlake
 Keane
 Keith Richards
 Killing Joke
 KSI
 Lenny Kravitz
 Level 42
 Lindemann
 Lionel Richie
 Machine Gun Kelly
 Manic Street Preachers
 Modest Mouse
 Nekfeu
 The Neville Brothers
 Nelly Furtado
 New Found Glory
 Nina Simone
 Oasis
 Ozzy Osbourne
 Paul Rodgers
 Pixies
 The Pogues
 Prince
 Pulp
 The Quireboys
 Robbie Williams
 Radiohead
 Rage Against the Machine
 Ramones
 Rihanna
 Robert Plant
 Rory Gallagher
 Scooter
 Skid Row 
 Smashing Pumpkins
 Snow Patrol
 Sparks (band)
 Soundgarden
 Steve Earle
 Steve Harley and Cockney Rebel (1992)
 Steve Harley (as a 3-man acoustic set, 2012)
 Stiff Little Fingers
 Throwing Muses
 Tokio Hotel
 Tom Jones
 The Who
 UFO
 Yungblud

References

External links

Forum Theatre at Cinema Treasures

Buildings and structures in the London Borough of Camden
Music venues in London
Art Deco architecture in London
Tourist attractions in the London Borough of Camden
Buildings and structures completed in 1934
Event venues established in 1934
1934 establishments in England
Kentish Town